Aliaga Habas power station is a gas-fired power station in İzmir Province in western Turkey. Like the nearby İzmir gas power plant it is one of the few gigawatt scale power stations in Turkey. However İzmir has a lot of potential for more solar, wind and geothermal energy.  Because hydropower is almost all much further east gas is the main source of flexible power in western Turkey and, as of 2022, gas is expensive: geothermal could be made more flexible to balance an increase in solar and wind.

References

External links 

 

Natural gas-fired power stations in Turkey
Buildings and structures in İzmir Province